Eugene Powell is a South African former rugby league footballer who represented South Africa in the 1995 and 2000 World Cups.

References

Living people
South African rugby league players
South Africa national rugby league team players
Rugby league props
Year of birth missing (living people)